Anton Rintelen (15 November 1876 in Graz, Austria – 28 January 1946) was an Austrian academic, jurist and politician. Initially associated with the right wing Christian Social Party, he later became involved in a Nazi coup d'état plot.

Early years
Rintelen was the son of a well-known lawyer and studied law at University of Graz from 1894 to 1898, at which pointed he began lecturing in civil law at the university. He would later serve as a professor at the same institute. He was also a professor at the Charles University in Prague before taking up a career in politics with the Christian Social Party. He served the party as Landeshauptmann of Styria from 1919 to 1926 and again from 1928 to 1933 and as Minister of Education in 1926 and 1932-3. He was the president of the Federal Council of Austria in 1923.
Rintelen was also the founder and President of Steirer Bank although the scandal that followed the collapse of this initiative in 1926 was enough to see him lose his role as Landeshauptmann for a period.

In his role in Styria he was active in supporting the local Heimwehr leader Walter Pfrimer. He also maintained close links with another right-wing militia leader Georg Escherich. Rintelen's links to the far right made him a target for leftists and in May 1921 a group of miners in St. Lorenzen attacked Rintelen, throwing him out a window and stoning him. Rintelen hoped to use the Heimwehr and related groups as a personal army to launch his own version of the March on Rome and indeed he even tried unsuccessfully to enlist the aid of Benito Mussolini in this venture. He was sent to Rome in 1933 as Ambassador to Italy. Here he became involved in intrigues with NSDAP leaders from Austria and Germany and worked to push Italian sentiments towards Nazism.

July Putsch

Despite having been a member of his government, Rintelen had become an opponent of Engelbert Dollfuss and the Austrian National Socialist Party. He planned a coup d'état under the direction of Theodor Habicht, Rudolf Weydenhammer, and Fridolin Glass. Rintelen was considered a prospective Chancellor in 1934. Rintelen wanted to quit at the last minute but the plan went ahead, although it proved a failure, resulting in the death of Dollfuss but not a Nazi government.

Rintelen's involvement in the July coup d'état saw him sentenced to life imprisonment for treason in 1935. He was released in 1938 following the Anschluss, but took no further part in politics.

References

1876 births
1946 deaths
University of Graz alumni
Academic staff of the University of Graz
Academic staff of Charles University
Austrian bankers
Austrian Nazis
Austrian prisoners sentenced to life imprisonment
Government ministers of Austria
Members of the Federal Council (Austria)
Presidents of the Austrian Federal Council
Christian Social Party (Austria) politicians
People convicted of treason against Austria
Prisoners sentenced to life imprisonment by Austria
Politicians from Graz
Governors of Styria
Education ministers